Corythoichthys conspicillatus, the reticulate pipefish, is a species of pipefish from the family Syngnathidae.

Taxonomy
This species is often confused with Corythoichthys flavofasciatus and the two were considered conspecific by some authorities but it is now widely accepted as a valid species with C. flavofasciatus being restricted to the Red Sea.

Distribution
This species is widespread in the tropical Indo-Pacific, from the Red Sea to French Polynesia.

Description

These pipefishes have reddish to reddish-brown and yellow bands on their body which have a reticulated pattern of lines superimposed on them, there are red spots on the snout, and the tail is pink to reddish with a white margin. The males have a bluish-black blotch around their anus which becomes more intense in colour during courtship.

Biology and habitat
It is normally seen in pairs or small groups.

References 

Fish described in 1842
conspicillatus
Fish of the Pacific Ocean
Fish of the Indian Ocean